Jan Charouz (born 17 July 1987) is a Czech motor racing driver. He won the 2009 Le Mans Series season and 2006 F3000 International Masters season, as well as taking fourth place in the 2009 24 Hours of Le Mans. In 2010 he was the Renault Formula One team reserve driver and has also competed in the World Series by Renault Formula Renault 3.5 Championship and Auto GP.

He is the son of Charouz Racing System founder and team principal .

Open-wheel career

Formula One

Renault Team reserve driver
For the 2010 season, Charouz became the Renault F1 Team reserve driver. As reserve driver he participates in Renault F1 Team test sessions, and he could be recruited for Grand Prix Friday free practices in official colours of Renault F1 Team. On March 18, 2010, Charouz drove the Renault R29 for the first time in his career during a shakedown at the Silverstone Circuit in Great Britain.

HRT Team reserve driver
On 16 November 2011, Charouz drove for the HRT F1 Team at the Yas Marina Circuit for the Abu Dhabi young drivers' test. After completing 56 laps (311 km), over 4 stints, he finished the day in 11th position with a time of 1’46.644. The test in Abu Dhabi allowed Charouz to take part in Brazil because it secured him his FIA Super Licence  - meaning he could take part in an F1 Grand Prix weekend.

World Series by Renault
Charouz participated in the 2010 World Series by Renault Formula Renault 3.5 as a member of the P1 Motorsport driver line-up.

AutoGP
Jan Charouz participated in the 2010 AutoGP championship as the member of Charouz Gravity Racing driver line-up.

Le Mans Series and 24 Hours of Le Mans

2009
Successful cooperation with factory Aston Martin Racing team continued also in season 2009 and similar programme as in previous two seasons was prepared for Jan. He participated in complete 2009 Le Mans Series season and 2009 24 Hours of Le Mans however team presented itself with brand new built prototype Aston Martin LMP1. Jan Charouz together with his teammates Tomáš Enge (CZE) and Stefan Mucke (GER) finished fourth in 24 hours of Le Mans, driving Aston Martin LMP1 #007 car. Jan Charouz, Tomáš Enge and Stefan Mucke with Aston Martin Racing were crowned the 2009 Le Mans Series champions claiming the Team and Driver titles 50 years on from Aston Martin winning the World Sportscar Championship in 1959 with the DBR1. The 007 LMP1 car of Jan, Tomáš and Stefan recording five podium finishes (including two wins at Barcelona and Nürburgring) from five races.

Racing record

Career summary

‡ Includes points scored by other A1 Team Czech Republic drivers.

Complete Italian Formula 3000 Championship results
(key) (Races in bold indicate pole position; races in italics indicate fastest lap)

Complete A1 Grand Prix results
(key)

Complete F3000 International Masters results
(key) (Races in bold indicate pole position; races in italics indicate fastest lap)

Complete European Le Mans Series results

24 Hours of Le Mans results

Complete Formula Renault 3.5 Series results
(key) (Races in bold indicate pole position) (Races in italics indicate fastest lap)

Complete GP2 Final results
(key) (Races in bold indicate pole position) (Races in italics indicate fastest lap)

Complete Formula One participations
(key) (Races in bold indicate pole position) (Races in italics indicate fastest lap)

Gallery

References

External links 

  (Czech)
 
 

1987 births
Living people
Czech racing drivers
Formula BMW ADAC drivers
Auto GP drivers
Eurocup Mégane Trophy drivers
International Formula Master drivers
FIA GT Championship drivers
A1 Team Czech Republic drivers
American Le Mans Series drivers
European Le Mans Series drivers
24 Hours of Le Mans drivers
24 Hours of Daytona drivers
World Series Formula V8 3.5 drivers
GP2 Series drivers
Rolex Sports Car Series drivers
FIA World Endurance Championship drivers
24 Hours of Spa drivers
Sportspeople from Prague
Sébastien Loeb Racing drivers
Carlin racing drivers
Charouz Racing System drivers
P1 Motorsport drivers
A1 Grand Prix drivers
Ma-con Motorsport drivers
Kolles Racing drivers
Starworks Motorsport drivers
Team Rosberg drivers
ISR Racing drivers
Aston Martin Racing drivers
Alan Docking Racing drivers
Jota Sport drivers
OAK Racing drivers